Canka is a surname. Notable people with the name include:

Abramo Canka (born 2002), Italian basketball player
Līna Čanka (1893–1981), Latvian corporal
Mikel Canka (born 1987), Albanian footballer

See also
Kanka (name), given name and surname